Mount Jackson may refer to:

Mountain summits
Mount Jackson (Antarctica)
Mount Jackson, Western Australia
Mount Jackson (Colorado)
Mount Jackson (Montana)
Mount Jackson (Madison County, Montana), a mountain in Madison County, Montana
Mount Jackson (New Hampshire)
Mount Jackson (Wyoming)

Communities
 Mount Jackson, Pennsylvania
 Mount Jackson, Virginia

See also 
 
 Jackson Hill (disambiguation)
 Jackson Mountains, Nevada
 Jackson Peak, Antarctica
 Chimney Rock (Jackson Butte), Colorado